Chernigov is a city in northern Ukraine.

Chernigov may also refer to:

Places
 Chernigov Oblast, Ukrainian SSR, USSR
 Chernigov electoral district (Russian Constituent Assembly election, 1917)
 Chernigov Governorate, Russian Empire
 Chernigov Regiment, Empire of Russia
 Chernigov Voivodship, Ruthenia, Polish-Lithuanian Commonwealth
 Principality of Chernigov, Kievan Rus

Facilities and structures
 Chernigov Airport, Chernigov, Ukraine
 Chernigov (air base), Chernigov, Ukraine SSR, USSR

Other uses
 29th Chernigov Infantry Regiment
 SK Chernigov, Chernigov, Ukraine; a soccer team

See also

 Chernigov Province (disambiguation)
 
 Chernihiv (disambiguation)